President is a historic, steam-powered narrowboat, built in 1909 by Fellows Morton & Clayton (FMC) at their dock at Saltley, Birmingham, England. It is now owned by the Black Country Living Museum, where it is based.
President is registered by National Historic Ships as part of the National Historic Fleet.

Early years

She was registered on 23 June that year. Her riveted, wrought iron hull is shaped in the 'Josher' style, named for FMC director Joshua Fellows.

In 1925, the Ruston, Proctor and Company steam boiler and engine were replaced by a 15 hp Bolinder crude oil engine.

Ernest Thomas, a director of FMC, and a Walsall-based coal carrier, acquired the boat in 1946. She was sold to George and Matthews of Wolverhampton in 1948, but that year the UK's canals were nationalised and she finished her working days as part of British Waterways' northern maintenance fleet, on the Trent and Mersey, Macclesfield and Shropshire Union canals, from a base at Northwich.

Preservation 

President was bought by Nicholas Bostock and Malcolm Braine in 1973, as a derelict hull. They restored the hull and constructed a replica cabin and boiler room. A 1928 Muir and Findley "Scotch" return boiler, similar to that originally used, but operating at 100 PSI was acquired and fitted, as was a twin cylinder steam engine, originally used in a Thames launch. The boat returned to service in 1978.

Black Country Living Museum 

President was purchased by the Black Country Living Museum in January 1983.  The boiler was replaced by a Cochran dryback return flue boiler in 1990.  A major refit took place from 2001–2003, including the provision of a new steam engine, pipework and cabin, plus major hull repairs.

President, in FMC livery, normally operates with a butty boat, Kildare. In 1992 she paired with Kildare on a 257 mile journey through Cheshire and Staffordshire to raise money for orphaned children in Romania.

On 3 June 2012, President took part in the Thames Diamond Jubilee Pageant in London, representing the Lord-Lieutenant of Staffordshire, having spent three weeks making the journey from Etruria Industrial Museum, Stoke-on-Trent, at an average speed of 3 mph.

Her boiler failed an inspection in 2018 and is beyond economical repair.

Bibliography

References

External links 

 
 Steam Narrow Boat President
 crew blog
 National Historic Ships website

Steamboats in Europe
Vehicles introduced in 1909
Black Country Living Museum
Transport in Birmingham, West Midlands
Canal boats of the United Kingdom
Ships and vessels of the National Historic Fleet